Alan Thomson (1 September 1899 – 15 September 1938) was an Australian sportsman. He played one first-class cricket match for Victoria in 1926. He also played Australian rules football for the St Kilda Football Club in the Victorian Football League (VFL).

See also
 List of Victoria first-class cricketers

References

External links
 

1899 births
1938 deaths
Australian cricketers
Victoria cricketers
Australian rules footballers from Victoria (Australia)
St Kilda Football Club players